June Andenæs (born 9 June 1983) is a retired Norwegian handball player, who last played for Vipers Kristiansand.

Achievements
EHF Champions League:
Winner: 2020/2021
Norwegian League:
Winner: 2019/2020 (Vipers), 2020/2021 (Vipers)
Silver Medalist: 2011/2012 (Byåsen), 2012/2013 (Byåsen), 2013/2014 (Byåsen), 2017/2018 (Larvik)
Bronze Medalist: 2016/2017 (Glassverket)
Norwegian Cup:
Winner: 2019, 2020

References

1983 births
Living people
People from Gloppen
Norwegian female handball players
Norwegian expatriate sportspeople in Russia
Sportspeople from Vestland